Margaux Artemia Fragoso (April 15, 1979 – June 23, 2017) was an American author, best known for the memoir Tiger, Tiger.

Early life
Fragoso was born to a working-class family and grew up in Union City, New Jersey. Her father was a Puerto Rican jeweler who had a bad temper and drank heavily, while her mother, who was of Swedish, Norwegian and Japanese descent, suffered from severe mental illness, necessitating several hospitalizations. From the age of seven, Fragoso was groomed and sexually abused by a middle-aged man, given the pseudonym "Peter Curran" in her memoir "Tiger, Tiger".

Career

Fragoso attended New Jersey City University and then Binghamton University, earning a Ph.D. in 2009. In 2011, she published Tiger, Tiger: A Memoir, which became a bestseller.

Personal life and death
Fragoso was married twice, to Steve McGowan, with whom she had a daughter, and in 2010 married Tom O'Connor. She died of ovarian cancer in 2017, aged 38.

References

1979 births
2017 deaths
People from Union City, New Jersey
People from West New York, New Jersey
New Jersey City University alumni
Binghamton University alumni
American women memoirists
21st-century American memoirists
Deaths from cancer in Louisiana
Deaths from ovarian cancer
Writers from New Jersey
21st-century American women